Huancabamba is a town in Northern Peru, capital of the province Huancabamba in the region Piura. It is situated in the valley of the Huancabamba river, along which the old Inca road passed leading from Quito to Cajamarca.

References

Victor von Hagen, The Royal Road of the Inca (1976)

Populated places in the Piura Region